The Summit Series  was an eight-game series of ice hockey between the Soviet Union and Canada, held in September 1972.

Summit Series may also refer to:
 1974 Summit Series, a competition between Soviet and Canadian professional ice hockey players
 Summit Series (conference), a non-profit organization

See also
 2007 Super Series, a competition between Russian and Canadian professional ice hockey players
 Super Series (disambiguation)